USS Mississippi (SSN-782) is a  of the United States Navy, named for the state of Mississippi. The contract to build her was awarded to the Electric Boat Division of General Dynamics Corporation in Groton, Connecticut on 14 August 2003. Mississippis keel was laid down on 9 June 2010. 
Mississippi was christened on 3 December 2011 at General Dynamics Electric Boat in Groton, Connecticut. Allison Stiller, Deputy Assistant Secretary of the Navy, is the ship's sponsor. The submarine was commissioned at a ceremony on 2 June 2012 in Pascagoula, Mississippi. SSN-782 was delivered 12 months ahead of schedule and $60 million below planned cost.

On 25 November 2014, Mississippi arrived at Joint Base Pearl Harbor-Hickam in Pearl Harbor, Hawaii, where the ship is permanently assigned to Submarine Squadron 1 of the United States Pacific Fleet.

References

External links 

 

Virginia-class submarines
Nuclear submarines of the United States Navy
2011 ships